Bos is a genus of domestic cattle.

Bos, BOS or BoS may also refer to:

Companies and organizations
 Bank of Scotland
 Bilbao Orkestra Sinfonikoa, a symphony orchestra in Bilbao, Basque Country
 B.O.S. Better Online Solutions, an Israeli RFID company
 Blue Oak School, in Napa, California, sometimes called BOS 
 Board of Studies, NSW state education board
 Boeddhistische Omroep Stichting, a Dutch public broadcaster
 Borneo Orangutan Survival, foundation
 Boston’s professional sports teams
 Boston Celtics of the National Basketball Association
 Boston Red Sox of Major League Baseball
 Boston Bruins of the National Hockey League
 British Orthodontic Society

Computing and technology
 Balance of system, components of a photovoltaic system besides panels
 Basic oxygen steelmaking
 BOS/360, operating system for System/360 computers developed by IBM
 Bonita Open Solution, open-source workflow and business management software
 Business Operating System (software), a cross-platform operating system

Transportation
 BOS, IATA location identifier for Logan International Airport, Boston, Massachusetts, USA
 BOS, ICAO airline designator for OpenSkies
 BOS, Amtrak station code for South Station, Boston, Massachusetts
 Bataviasche Oosterspoorweg Maatschapij (Batavian Eastern Railway Company)

Other
 Bos (film)
 Bos (surname)
 Bos (Nahe), a river in western Germany
 Boş, a village in Hunedoara, Hunedoara County, Romania
 BOS, a South African brand of ice tea
 Baku Olympic Stadium, Azerbaijan
 Background Oriented Schlieren, an optical flow visualization technique
 Book of Shadows, a witch's book of rituals
 Business operating system (management), a standard collection of business processes
 Behavioral Observation Scale, used for employee performance appraisal
 bos, the ISO 639 alpha-3 code for the Bosnian language
 Brotherhood of Steel in the Fallout universe

See also
 Boss (disambiguation)